Shanna M. Woyak is a United States Air Force major general who has served as the Director of the Small Market and Stand Alone Medical Treatment Facility Organization of the Defense Health Agency since June 2021. Previously, she was the Director of the National Capital Medical Directorate from October 10, 2019, to July 2, 2020.

References

Living people
Place of birth missing (living people)
Recipients of the Defense Superior Service Medal
Recipients of the Legion of Merit
United States Air Force generals
United States Air Force personnel of the Iraq War
Year of birth missing (living people)